is a large thermal power station operated by Tokyo Electric in Yokosuka, Kanagawa, Japan. The facility is located in Kurihama, at the southern tip of Miura Peninsula.

All the older generation units were decommissioned by 2014.

In 2019, construction started on two coal-powered units, to enter service in 2023 and 2024, and generate 1.3 gigawatts total.

History
Plans to build a power station in Yokosuka were drawn up in 1957, and a site was prepared next to Kurihama Port by filling in part of the bay. The 1st unit with a 265 MW General Electric turbine, went on line in October 1960. A total of 8 units were constructed by 1970, giving the plant a total power generating capacity of 2630 MW, which served to power the cities of Kanagawa Prefecture and Tokyo Metropolis.

An additional gas turbine Unit 1 burning light oil was opened on an experimental basis in July 1971, followed by Gas Turbine Unit 2 (burning natural gas) in July 1993. However, plans were made to close the facility by the mid-2000s due to rising fuel and maintenance costs.  Unit 1 was closed in December 2004, followed by Unit 2 and Units 5-8 in March 2006. All remaining units were closed by April 2010.

In order to meet the expected shortage of electrical energy from the aftermath of the 2011 Tōhoku earthquake and tsunami and Fukushima Daiichi nuclear disaster, Tokyo Electric began reactivating mothballed portions of the plant, bringing Gas Turbine Unit 2 back on line on April 28, 2011, Gas Turbine Unit 1 on June 2, 2011.  Unit 3 was restored on June 19 and Unit 4 on July 6. Total generating capacity is now at 874 MW.

Tokyo Electric is planning to replace all existing equipment at the Yokosuka Thermal Power Plant with 13 new gas turbine units with a total rated capacity of 3296 MW within 2011.

Generating Units
Unit 1 (scrapped)
 Rated capacity: 265 MW (GE)
 Operational: October 1960 – December 2004

Unit 2 (scrapped)
 Rated capacity: 265 MW (Toshiba)
 Operational: September 1962 – March 2006

Unit 3 (operational)
Rated capacity: 350 MW (GE)
Operational: May 1964 – April 2010; resumed from June 19, 2011
Fuel: heavy oil, crude oil

Unit 4 (operational)
Rated capacity: 350 MW (Toshiba)
Operational: July 1964 – March 2006; resumed from July 6, 2011
Fuel: Heavy Oil, Crude Oil

Unit 5 (mothballed)
Rated capacity: 350 MW (Toshiba)
Operational: July 1966 – April 2010
Fuel: Heavy Oil, Crude Oil

Unit 6 (mothballed)
Rated capacity: 350 MW (Toshiba)
Operational: January 1967 – April 2010
Fuel: Heavy Oil, Crude Oil

Unit 7 (mothballed)
Rated capacity: 350 MW (Toshiba)
Operational: September 1969 – April 2010
Fuel: Heavy Oil, Crude Oil

Unit 8 (mothballed)
Rated capacity: 350 MW (Toshiba)
Operational: January 1970 – April 2010
Fuel: Heavy Oil, Crude Oil

Gas Turbine Unit 1 (operational)
Rated capacity: 30 MW (Toshiba)
Operational: July 1971 – April 2010; resumed from June 2, 2011
Fuel: Diesel

Gas Turbine Unit 2 (operational)
Rated capacity: 144 MW (Toshiba)
Operational: July 1993 – April 2010; resumed from April 28, 2011
Fuel: light oil, natural gas

See also 

 Energy in Japan
 List of power stations in Japan

References 

Energy infrastructure completed in 1960
1960 establishments in Japan
Oil-fired power stations in Japan
Buildings and structures in Yokosuka, Kanagawa
Tokyo Electric Power Company